Keserovina (Serbian Cyrillic: Кесеровина) is a village located in the Užice municipality of Serbia. In the 2011 census, the village had a population of 452 people.

References

Užice
Populated places in Zlatibor District